Imai is a Japanese surname.

Imai or IMAI or variation, may also refer to:

Places
 Imai (star), a star also called Delta Crucis (δ Cru), located in the southern hemisphere constellation of Crux (the Southern Cross)
 8271 Imai, the asteroid Imai, 8271st asteroid registered
 Imai Station, Nagano, Nagano, Honshu, Japan; a train station

Other uses
 Imai Foundation (Inter Media Art Institute), a German multimedia art institute

See also

 
 
 Imai Toonz (aka Imaitoonz), a mononym, a Japanese artist
 Kami-Imai Station, Nakano, Nagano, Honshu, Japan; a rail station